The Cinema Audio Society Award for Outstanding Achievement in Sound Mixing for Television Series – One Hour is an annual award given by the Cinema Audio Society to live action motion picture sound mixer for their outstanding achievements in sound mixing. The award came to its current title in 2013, when one hour and half hour series were separated into two categories. Before this, the category was labeled Outstanding Achievement in Sound Mixing for Television Series, and was given annually starting in 1994, for series' episodes aired the previous year.

Winners and nominees

1990s
Outstanding Achievement in Sound Mixing for Television Pictures

2000s

2010s

Outstanding Achievement in Sound Mixing for Television Series – One Hour

2020s

Programs with multiple awards

6 awards
 Game of Thrones (HBO)

3 awards
 Deadwood (HBO)

2 awards
 24 (Fox)
 Boardwalk Empire (HBO)
 NYPD Blue (ABC)
 The West Wing (NBC)

Programs with multiple nominations

9 nominations
 24 (Fox)

8 nominations
 Game of Thrones (HBO)
 NYPD Blue (ABC)

6 nominations
 CSI: Crime Scene Investigation (CBS)
 The Sopranos (HBO)

5 nominations
 Better Call Saul (AMC)
 Boardwalk Empire (HBO)
 ER (NBC)
 The X-Files (Fox)

4 nominations
 Homeland (Showtime)
 The Walking Dead (AMC)
 The West Wing (NBC)

3 nominations
 Alias (ABC)
 Breaking Bad (AMC)
 Chicago Hope (CBS)
 Deadwood (HBO)
 Dexter (Showtime)
 The Handmaid's Tale (Hulu)
 Lost (ABC)
 Mad Men (AMC)
 Six Feet Under (HBO)
 Star Trek: Voyager (UPN)
 Stranger Things (Netflix)
 Westworld (HBO)

2 nominations
 The Crown (Netflix)
 Glee (Fox)
 Law & Order (NBC)
 Lois & Clark: The New Adventures of Superman (ABC)
 The Marvelous Mrs. Maisel (Amazon)
 Ozark (Netflix)
 Star Trek: The Next Generation (Syndicated)

See also
 Primetime Emmy Award for Outstanding Sound Mixing for a Comedy or Drama Series (One-Hour)

References

External links
 Cinema Audio Society Official website

Cinema Audio Society Awards
Awards established in 1993